Apodrepanulatrix litaria, the large banded wave, is a species of geometrid moth in the family Geometridae.

The MONA or Hodges number for Apodrepanulatrix litaria is 6694.

References

Further reading

External links

 

Caberini
Articles created by Qbugbot
Moths described in 1887